A dermal adhesive (or skin glue) is a glue used to close wounds in the skin, as an alternative to sutures, staples or clips.

Glued closure produces less scarring and is less prone to infection than sutured or stapled closure.  There is also no residual closure to remove, so follow-up visits for removal are not required.

Some research is ongoing on making biodegradable glue for use inside the body, which can thus be broken down safely by the body.

Products

See also 
 Liquid Bandage
 Cyanoacrylate#Medical and veterinary
 Bone cement

References

Surgical suture material